The 1983 New South Wales Open was a combined men's and women's tennis tournament played on outdoor grass courts at the White City Stadium in Sydney, Australia. The men's tournament, named ANZ Bank NSW Open, was part of the 1983 Volvo Grand Prix and held from 12 December until 18 December 1983. The women's tournament, known as the NSW Building Society Open, was part of the 1983 Virginia Slims World Championship Series and was played from 21 November through 27 November 1983. It was the 92nd edition of the tournament. Third-seeded Jo Durie won the women's singles title, the first British female player to do so since Dorothy Round in 1934.

Finals

Men's singles
 Joakim Nyström defeated  Mike Bauer 2–6, 6–3, 6–1
 It was Nyström's 1st singles title of his career.

Women's singles
 Jo Durie defeated  Kathy Jordan 6–3, 7–5
 It was Durie's 2nd and final singles title of the year and of her career.

Women's doubles
 Anne Hobbs /  Wendy Turnbull defeated  Hana Mandlíková /  Helena Suková 6–4, 6–3
 It was Hobbs' 5th title of the year and the 6th of her career. It was Turnbull's 4th title of the year and the 56th of her career.

Men's doubles
 Pat Cash /  Mike Bauer defeated  Broderick Dyke /  Rod Frawley 7–6, 6–4

References

External links
  ITF men's tournament edition details
 ITF women's tournament edition details
 Tournament draws

New South Wales Open
Sydney International
New South Wales Open
New South Wales Open
New South Wales Open
New South Wales Open, 1983